Bongane Twala (born 11 July 1988) is a South African footballer who played as a midfielder for Premier Soccer League clubs.

References

1988 births
Living people
People from Sebokeng
Sportspeople from Gauteng
South African soccer players
Association football midfielders
Mamelodi Sundowns F.C. players
Mpumalanga Black Aces F.C. players
Moroka Swallows F.C. players